José Luis Rodríguez Francis (born 19 June 1998), commonly known as Puma, is a Panamanian professional footballer who plays as a left winger for Primeira Liga club Famalicão and the Panama national team.

Personal life
Rodríguez grew up in El Chorrillo, Panama City and is the brother of retired Chorrillo captain Marcos Villarreal. He was nicknamed "Cocobolo" at a young age for his short hair.

Club career
Rodríguez played for hometown club Chorrillo in his youth. In the 2015–16 season of the Liga Panameña de Fútbol, he made his debut on 17 July 2015 in a 0–1 away loss against Atlético Chiriquí. His first and only goal of the season came on 2 April 2016 in a 3–2 away win against Alianza, scoring the winning goal for Chorrillo in the 90th minute. In 2016, Rodríguez moved to the under-21 team of Belgium club Gent on loan with an option to buy. On 9 December 2016, Gent signed Rodríguez on a permanent deal, with a contract lasting until 2019. In September 2018 he signed for Croatian club Istra 1961.

On 1 February 2019, Rodríguez joined Deportivo Alavés and would play for their B-team. He made his first team – and La Liga – debut on 10 July of the following year, replacing Joselu in a 0–2 away loss against Real Madrid.

On 4 September 2020, Rodríguez renewed his contract with Alavés until 2022, and was immediately loaned to Segunda División side CD Lugo for the season. On 30 July of the following year, he moved to fellow league team Sporting de Gijón also in a temporary deal.

On 15 August 2022, Rodríguez signed a four-year contract with Primeira Liga side F.C. Famalicão.

International career
Rodríguez was called up to the Panama under-17 team in 2014, scoring on 3 March 2015 against Haiti in the 2015 CONCACAF U-17 Championship.

On 14 May 2018, Rodríguez was included in Panama's preliminary squad for the 2018 FIFA World Cup, the country's first ever FIFA World Cup. Rodríguez made his international debut for Panama on 29 May 2018 in a 0–0 friendly home draw against Northern Ireland. The following day, Rodríguez was included in Panama's final 23-man World Cup squad.

Rodríguez made his World Cup debut in Panama's opening match on 18 June 2018 in a 0–3 loss to Belgium, starting the match before being substituted in the 63rd minute for Ismael Díaz.

Career statistics

Club

International

International goals
Scores and results list Panama's goal tally first.

References

External links

José Luis Rodríguez at LaLiga

1998 births
Living people
Sportspeople from Panama City
Panamanian footballers
Unión Deportivo Universitario players
K.A.A. Gent players
NK Istra 1961 players
Deportivo Alavés B players
Deportivo Alavés players
CD Lugo players
Sporting de Gijón players
F.C. Famalicão players
Croatian Football League players
Liga Panameña de Fútbol players
La Liga players
Segunda División players
Segunda División B players
Tercera División players
Panamanian expatriate footballers
Expatriate footballers in Belgium
Expatriate footballers in Croatia
Expatriate footballers in Portugal
Panamanian expatriate sportspeople in Belgium
Panamanian expatriate sportspeople in Croatia
Panamanian expatriate sportspeople in Portugal
2018 FIFA World Cup players
2019 CONCACAF Gold Cup players
2021 CONCACAF Gold Cup players
Panama international footballers
Association football midfielders